The 2018–19 season is Hull City's second consecutive season in the Championship and their 115th year in existence. Along with the Championship, the club competed in the FA Cup and EFL Cup.

The season covers the period from 1 July 2018 to 30 June 2019.

Events
 On 18 May 2018, Josh Clackstone, Greg Luer, David Meyler and Greg Olley were released by the club, while Max Clark, Abel Hernández, Sebastian Larsson and Moses Odubajo were offered new deals.
 On 18 May 2018, Adam Curry signed a new one-year deal with the club.
 On 4 June 2018, Abel Hernández left the club by mutual consent after failing to agree a new contract with the club.
 On 11 June 2018 Sebastian Larsson rejected a new contract offer deciding to return to Sweden to play for AIK.
On 14 June 2018, Moses Odubajo rejected a contract extension with the club and will leave on 1 July 2018.
 On 22 June 2018, defender Eric Lichaj signed a two-year deal with Hull City for an undisclosed fee.
 On 22 June 2018, Max Clark was reported as joining Vitesse Arnhem at the end of his contract.
 On 1 July 2018, Callum Smith joined in a free transfer from Newcastle United.
 On 5 July 2018, Craig Fagan and Luke Templeman were appointed to the coaching staff of the Academy.
 On 9 July 2018, David Milinković of Genoa signed a three-year deal with the club for an undisclosed fee.
 On 10 July 2018, Reece Burke of West Ham United signed a three-year deal with the club for an undisclosed fee.
 On 11 July 2018, Jordy de Wijs of PSV Eindhoven signed a three-year deal with the club for an undisclosed fee.
 On 17 July 2018,  Todd Kane signed on a season-long loan from Chelsea.
 On 18 July 2018, goalkeeper George Long of Sheffield United signed a three-year deal with the club for an undisclosed fee.
 On 27 July 2018, Charlie Andrew returned on a season-long loan to Pickering Town.
 On 1 August 2018, Markus Henriksen was named captain for the season.
 On 3 August 2018, Jonathan Edwards moved on a free transfer to FC Halifax Town.
 On 9 August 2018, goalkeeper Will Mannion went on loan at Aldershot Town until 20 January 2019, but this was later extended until the end of the season.
 On 24 August 2018, goalkeeper Callum Burton went on loan at Chesterfield until 16 January 2019.
 On 31 August 2018, Tommy Elphick joined on a season-long loan from  Aston Villa and Chris Martin joined on a season-long loan from Derby County.
 On 30 November 2018, Adam Curry moved on loan to Alfreton Town until 1 January 2019.
 On 5 December 2018, Max Sheaf signed a new two-and-a-half-year deal with the club.
 On 29 December 2018, Aston Villa recalled Tommy Elphick from his loan spell.
 On 4 January 2019, Will Keane moved to Ipswich Town on loan until the end of the season.
 In January 2019, Jarrod Bowen won the EFL Championship Player of the Month award for December 2018 and manager Nigel Adkins won the EFL Championship Manager of the Month award for December 2018.
 On 22 January 2019, Marc Pugh joined on loan from Bournemouth for the rest of the season.
 On 30 January 2019, Charlie Andrew's season-long loan to Pickering Town was cut short when he moved on loan to Bradford Park Avenue for the remainder of the season.
 On 31 January 2019, Liam Ridgewell signed a deal for the remainder of the season on a free transfer from Portland Timbers.
 On 2 February 2019, goalkeeper Harrison Foulkes joined Pickering Town on loan until the end of the season.
 On 5 February 2019, the new club crest was revealed that would be used from the start of the 2019–20 season.
 On 20 February 2019, Matty Jacob joined Pickering Town on loan until the end of the season.
 On 28 February 2019, former City goalkeeper,  Johnny Saltmer signed for Barrow until the end off the season.
 On 1 March 2019, Markus Henriksen and Will Mannion had their contracts with the club extended by 1 year.
 On 8 March 2019, goalkeeper David Robson moved to Stocksbridge Park Steels until 30 April 2019 to gain some work experience.
 On 28 March 2019, Adam Curry moved on loan to Alfreton Town for the remainder of the season.
 On 29 March 2019, Keane Lewis-Potter went out on loan to Bradford Park Avenue  for the remainder of the season.
 On 25 April 2019, Marc Pugh's loan spell ended as he returned to  Bournemouth with a broken toe sustained in the match against Sheffield United on 22 April.
 On 17 May 2019, the club announced that Callum Burton, Adam Curry, Evandro, Will Keane, Ondřej Mazuch, Liam Ridgewell and James Weir were released at the end of the season. At the same time they indicated that new contracts would be offered to Fraizer Campbell and David Marshall.
 On 8 June 2019, manager Nigel Atkins indicated that he would not take-up the offer of a new contract with the club and would leave the club at the end of the season. Assistant manager Andy Crosby would also leave the club at the same time.

First team squad

Out on loan

Transfers

Transfers in

Transfers out

Loans in

Loans out

Pre-season

The players returned to pre-season training on 25 June 2018. On 8 July 2018 the team travelled to Portugal for a 12-day training camp. On 25 May 2018 two fixtures were confirmed as part of the Portugal trip, Maritimo on 10 July 2018 and Braga on 13 July 2018. On 31 May 2018 an away fixture against Rochdale on 21 July 2018 was announced and a home fixture against Newcastle United was announced to take place on 24 July 2018. A further away fixture against Barnsley was scheduled for 28 July 2018.
The final work-out for the team was the Billy Bly Memorial Trophy against North Ferriby United that was contested at the Chadwick Stadium, North Ferriby on 30 July 2018.

Competitions

Overall

Championship

League table

Results by matchday

Result summary

Matches
The fixtures for the season were announced on 21 June 2018. Hull start the season with a home match against Aston Villa, run by former manager Steve Bruce, on 6 August 2018. This being the reverse of the opening match of the previous season. The season will close on 5 May 2019 with a home match against Bristol City.

EFL Cup

The draw for the first-round of the cup took place on 15 June 2018 in Ho Chi Minh City, Vietnam with the ties taking place in the week commencing 13 August 2018. Hull were in the Northern Section of the draw and were drawn away to Sheffield United. The match was played on 14 August 2018. Hull got off to a good start with Jon Toral opening the scoring on the 18-minute mark, both teams had chances to score but it was not until the 75th minute that Billy Sharp brought Sheffield level. The match finished 1–1 and a penalty shootout was required to find a winner. Sheffield got off to a bad start with Oliver Norwood missing his kick but all the other kicks were converted so Hull won 5–4 on penalties, to put them in to the second-round. The draw for the second-round took place the following day and Hull was drawn at home to Derby County, matches to take place week beginning 27 August 2018. The match took place on 28 August 2018, and Derby County got off the ground after 24-minutes when Martyn Waghorn lobbed the ball over George Long on his debut for Hull. Florian Jozefzoon scored his first goal for Derby after 38-minutes and after 73-minutes he again shot at goal which was deflected in by Brandon Fleming. Mason Mount added a fourth just before full-time, leaving Hull to exit the competition 0–4 on the night.

FA Cup

The draw for the Third Round of the FA Cup took place at Stamford Bridge on 3 December 2018. Hull were drawn away to their next league opponents Millwall with the match taking place over the week-end of 4–7 January 2019. The match was chosen for live broadcast and scheduled for 14:00 on 6 January 2019.
The first-half saw Millwall have the better of the chances but failed to capitalise. Early in the second-half Jon Toral broke the deadlock for Hull. Following a triple substitution by Millwall after 64-minutes things turned Millwall's way with substitute Shane Ferguson opening their account in the 82nd minute. Three minutes later he scored a second to give Millwall a 2–1 victory.

Statistics

Appearances

Note: Appearances shown after a "+" indicate player came on during course of match.

Disciplinary record

Top scorers

Kits
The home kit for the 2018–19 season was unveiled on 8 June 2018, manufactured by Umbro, the shirt is a traditional black and amber vertical stripped design, complemented by black with amber trim shorts and amber socks with black bands. The away kit was unveiled on 20 July 2018 as all black with amber trim.
The third kit was revealed on 13 August 2018, as all white shirts and socks with Sulphur Spring detailing. With the shorts being Sulphur Spring. SportPesa is the shirt sponsor and in March 2019 it was announced that this sponsorship would be extended to the 2019–20 season.

Awards
The annual awards for the club took place on 7 May 2019 and saw Jarrod Bowen pick-up the Player of the Year, Players' Player of the Year and Supporters' Player of the Year awards.
Evandro Goebel was presented with the Goal of the Season award for his goal against Aston Villa on 19 January 2019. Keane Lewis-Potter took the award for Academy Player of the Year.

Notes

References

2018-19
Hull City
2010s in Kingston upon Hull